Kingston Nkhatha (born 27 October 1985) is a Zimbabwean footballer who plays as a striker for Mbombela United in the South African National First Division and the Zimbabwe national team.

Career

Club

Early career
Nkhatha started his career in Zimbabwe with Buymore F.C. and CAPS United, before departing to South Africa to sign for Free State Stars. Less than a year after signing for Free State Stars, Nkhatha was loaned out to Carara Kicks. He returned to FS Stars in 2009 and remained with the club until he left in 2011 to join Black Leopards, eight goals in twenty-two appearances followed before he was signed by Kaizer Chiefs.

Kaizer Chiefs
He joined Kaizer Chiefs in July 2012 under new coach Stuart Baxter. He made his league debut on 11 August 2012 in a 6–0 win over AmaZulu. He scored the second goal on debut in the 42nd minute. He went on to score eight goals in 24 matches for the 2012–13 season. Nkhatha urged fans to stop booing him or other players when fans started to boo him towards the end of the 2012–13 and the beginning of the 2013–14 season. He said "As a professional, you cannot take these things to heart otherwise they will destroy you. But I still ask our fans to stop doing it. It is not good for the team". He scored his first goal of the 2013–14 as an equaliser in the Soweto derby to silence critics.

He also started off the 2014 CAF Champions League campaign with a brace in a 3–0 win over Black Africa on 8 February 2014. The first, a long range shot and the second, a header over advancing goalkeeper, Arnold Subeb after a pinpoint drop kick from Itumeleng Khune in the 87th minute. Nkhatha scored 7 goals in the 2013–14 season again. During 2014–15 pre-season friendlies, he scored against Chippa United in a 4–2 win in Port Elizabeth he competed in the 2014 Carling Black Label Cup but got injured and bruised his thigh in the 23rd minute after clashing with Senzo Meyiwa. In the fourth quarter final of the 2014 MTN 8, Nkhatha scored Chiefs' second goal only in the 5th minute after taking the lead from Reneilwe Letsholonyane's 2nd-minute goal, with a 22-yard volley that first hit the underside of the cross bar. Chiefs won 4–0. In total, Nkhatha made 69 league appearances before departing in 2015.

SuperSport United
On 16 January 2015, Nkhatha joined Premier Soccer League outfit SuperSport United on a three-and-a-half-year contract. He made his debut on 11 February against his former club Free State Stars and scored his first SuperSport Utd goal in the process. He won his first trophy with SuperSport Utd in May 2016 when the club won the 2015–16 Nedbank Cup.

International
Nkhatha has won 10 caps and scored 3 goals for the Zimbabwe national team. His international goals have come against Madagascar and Malawi.

Career statistics

Club
.

International
.

International goals
. Scores and results list Zimbabwe's goal tally first.

Honours

Club
Kaizer Chiefs 
Premier Soccer League – 2012–13
Nedbank Cup – 2012–13
Carling Black Label Cup – 2013
MTN 8 – 2014

SuperSport United
 Nedbank Cup (2): 2015–16, 2016–17
 MTN 8 – 2017

References

External links
Kingston Nkhatha at Footballdatabase

1985 births
Living people
Association football forwards
CAPS United players
Free State Stars F.C. players
Black Leopards F.C. players
Kaizer Chiefs F.C. players
SuperSport United F.C. players
Dynamos F.C. players
Mbombela United F.C. players
South African Premier Division players
National First Division players
Expatriate soccer players in South Africa
Zimbabwean expatriates in South Africa
Zimbabwean footballers
Zimbabwe international footballers
Carara Kicks F.C. players